Khin Shwe (born 21 January 1952) Burmese business tycoon and politician who served as a Member of parliament in the House of Nationalities for Yangon Region № 9 constituency from 2011 to 2016. He is the chairman of Zaykabar Construction, one of the country's largest construction companies. He also serves as chairman for the National Development Group of Companies, Myanmar Tourism Board and the Myanmar Construction Entrepreneurs Association.

Early life and education
Khin Shwe was born in Moulmein (now Mawlamyaing), Burma to ethnic Mon-Burmese parents, Saw Nyunt and Daw Daung. He attended a technical high school in Maymyo and worked for the Burmese government until 1988, as a construction and survey engineer. Khin Shwe claims to hold two honorary doctorate degrees in business administration. However, both are from unaccredited for-profit diploma mills, Washington University and Cal Southern University.

Business holding
In 1988, he established Padamya Company with Htein Win and 2 other partners. In 1990, he formed his own construction company, Zaykabar Company, one of the country's largest construction companies. Later, he became chairman of the National Development Group of Companies, Myanmar Tourism Board and the Myanmar Construction Entrepreneurs Association.

The Burmese government has awarded him two titles: Thiri Thudhamma Manijotadhara (1998) and Agga Maha Thirithudhamma  Manijhotadhara (2001). Khin Shwe is head of Sasana Nogghaha, a religious organization supported by the Burmese government.

Along with Htay Myint, Dagon Win Aung and Nay Zin Latt, Khin Shwe serves as a patron of the Myanmar Hoteliers Association.

Shwe Mann and Khin Shwe are related by marriage: Shwe Mann's son, Toe Naing Mann, is married to Zay Zin Latt, Khin Shwe's daughter. Khin Shwe's son Zay Thiha, promoter of the World Lethwei Championship, is married to Nanda Hlaing, a Burmese actress and model.

Political career
He is a member of the Union Solidarity and Development Party. In the 2010 Myanmar general election, he contested the Yangon Region № 9 constituency winning a majority of 173,208 (73.76 percent of the votes), won a House of Nationalities seat.

In the aftermath of the 2021 Myanmar coup d'état, he was arrested and sent to Insein Prison on 23 March 2021 along with his son Zay Thiha, following a conflict over a failed building development on military-owned land in Yangon. They are the first major cronies to be arrested after the coup.

References

Members of the House of Nationalities
Burmese businesspeople
1952 births
Living people
People from Mawlamyine
Burmese people of Mon descent